Kenneth Raymond Seeley (born October 25, 1962) is an interventionist and author. He is best known for his appearances on the A&E reality show, Intervention. Certified as a CIP, CCMI-M, RAS, CATC, Seeley himself has been sober since July 14, 1989. Since then, he has worked full-time in the business of recovery.

Career
Seeley is the author of Face It and Fix It, published by HarperOne in 2009.

Seeley has remained involved, professionally and personally, in recovery since 1989. In an early episode of Intervention he revealed he was once addicted to crystal meth. He became sober on July 14, 1989. He is a Certified Intervention Professional, Master's Level Case Manager / Interventionist, Registered Addiction Specialist, and Certified Addiction Treatment Counselor.

Seeley is a regular contributor to CNN, MSNBC, NBC, CBS, Fox, and ABC on the topic of addiction. Seeley was one of three featured interventionists on the Emmy Award Winning Television Series Intervention on A&E.

Honors
In 2011, a Golden Palm Star on the Palm Springs, California, Walk of Stars was dedicated to him.

Personal life
Seeley resides in California with his partner, Eric McLaughlin.

See also
 Drug rehabilitation
 Sober Coach
 Sober living environment

References

1962 births
Living people
American self-help writers
American gay writers